Honeysuckles (Lonicera species) are used as food plants by the larvae of a number of Lepidoptera species including:

 Arctiidae
 Garden tiger moth (Arctia caja)
 Giant leopard moth (Hypercompe scribonia)
 Geometridae
 Autumnal moth (Epirrita autumnata)
 Common marbled carpet (Chloroclysta truncata)
 Engrailed (Ectropis crepuscularia)
 Mottled beauty (Alcis repandata)
 Mottled pug (Eupithecia exiguata)
 Mottled umber (Erannis defoliaria)
 Scalloped oak (Crocallis elinguaria)
 Swallow-tailed moth (Ourapteryx sambucaria)
 Noctuidae
 Early grey (Xylocampa areola)
 Copper underwing (Amphipyra pyramidea)
 Satellite (Eupsilia transversa)
 Nymphalidae
 Eurasian white admiral (Limenitis camilla)

External links

Honeysuckles
+Lepidoptera